Echiostachys is a genus of flowering plants belonging to the family Boraginaceae.

Its native range is South African Republic.

Species:

Echiostachys ecklonianus 
Echiostachys incanus 
Echiostachys spicatus

References

Boraginoideae
Boraginaceae genera